Baron Gustaf Nils Algernon Adolf Stierneld (July 12, 1791 – November 14, 1868) was a Swedish politician. He served twice as the Prime Minister for Foreign Affairs from 1838 to 1842, and from 1848 to 1856. He was born, and died, in Stockholm.

He studied at the universities of Kiel, Edinburg, and Uppsala. During the German Campaign of 1813 and the French Campaign of 1814 he served in Crown Prince Charles' (Bernadotte) chancellery and attended the conferences at Trachenberg (now Zmigrod, Poland), and Frankfurt. He also attended the peace congress at Kiel, which resulted in the Treaty of Kiel, where Denmark would cede Norway to Sweden. Starting in 1814 he served as the chargé d'affaires at The Hague and from 1818 to 1828 he was the Swedish envoy to London.

See also 
Sweden-Norway
Union between Sweden and Norway

Stierneld, Gustaf Nils Algernon Adolf
Stierneld, Gustaf Nils Algernon Adolf
Stierneld. Gustaf Nils
Stierneld, Gustaf Nils Algernon Adolf
Stierneld, Gustaf Nils Algernon Adolf
Alumni of the University of Edinburgh
Ambassadors of Sweden to the United Kingdom